Abū al-Ḥasan ʿAlī ibn Muḥammad ibn Muḥammad ash-Shaybānī, better known as ʿAlī ʿIzz ad-Dīn Ibn al-Athīr al-Jazarī (1160–1233) was a renowned Hadith expert, historian, and biographer who wrote in Arabic and was from the Ibn Athir family. At the age of twenty-one he settled with his father in Mosul to continue his studies, where he devoted himself to the study of history and Islamic tradition.

Biography 
Ibn al-Athir belonged to the Shayban lineage of the large and influential Arab tribe Banu Bakr, who lived across upper Mesopotamia, and gave their name to the city of Diyar Bakr. He is also described to have been of Kurdish origin.

He was the brother of Majd ad-Dīn and Diyā' ad-Dīn Ibn Athir. Al-Athir lived a scholarly life in Mosul, often visited Baghdad and for a time traveled with Saladin's army in Syria. He later lived in Aleppo and Damascus. His chief work was a history of the world, al-Kamil fi at-Tarikh (The Complete History). He died in the city of Mosul.

Modern age 
According to Reuters, his tomb was desecrated in Mosul by members of the al-Qaeda offshoot the Islamic State of Iraq and the Levant (ISIL) in June 2014.

Works 
 Al-Kāmil fī al-tārīkh (الكامل في التاريخ): "The Complete History"; 11 volumes
 al-Usd al-ghābah fi ma‘rifat al-ṣaḥābah: "The Lions of the Forest and the knowledge about the Companions"
 Jami' al-Usul fi Ahadeth ar-Rasul, a massive collection of Hadith (14 large volumes).
  n-Nihayatu fi Gharib al-Hadith wa al-Athar, a classical work on Gharib branch of Hadith terminology where Al-Suyuti said: "This is the best books of rare terms (ghareeb), the most complete, best known and most widely used."
 Al-Qawl al-Jamil fi 'Ilm al-Jarh wa at-Ta'dil
 Al-Tārīkh al-bāhir fī al-Dawlah al-Atābakīyah bi-al-Mawṣil 
 Al-Lubāb fī tahdhīb al-ansāb

See also 
 List of Muslim historians
 List of Islamic scholars
 List of Ash'aris and Maturidis
 Varangian

Notes

External links 

 Ibn al-Athīr's Accounts of the Rūs: A Commentary and Translation by William E. Watson from Canadian/American Slavic Studies
 https://web.archive.org/web/20060708214517/http://www.lib.umich.edu/area/Near.East/islhist.html
 http://www.bogvaerker.dk/Bookwright/rijal.html
 [ Kurds and Kurdistan], Encyclopaedia of Islam.

1160 births
1233 deaths
Arab biographers
12th-century Iranian historians
13th-century Arabic writers
13th-century Iranian historians
Khazar studies
Kurdish historians
Kurdish Muslims
Saladin
Shafi'is
Asharis
Hadith scholars